William Rudolph Gruber,  (December 17, 1890 – January 27, 1979) Brigadier general, was an instructor at the Army Command and General Staff School at Fort Leavenworth when Dwight D. Eisenhower was a student there. Following Eisenhower's graduation, Gruber and his wife Helen Drennan Gruber were joined by Dwight D. and Mamie Eisenhower on a 17-day, 1800 mile motor trip through Belgium, Germany, Switzerland and France in 1929.

They left Paris on August 28, 1929, and drove to Brussels, Belgium. Their route then took them to Bonn, Germany, south along the Rhine River to Coblenz, Heidelberg and through the Black Forest. They then went to Switzerland, spending seven days and visiting Zürich, Lucerne, Interlaken, Montreux, and Geneva, and surviving a harrowing crossing of the Furka Pass high in the Alps. From Switzerland the travelers went to Besançon, then to Romagne in France where they visited the American War Cemetery. While the ladies stayed to visit with a mutual friend, Gruber and Eisenhower toured the World War I battlefields in the area. Eisenhower was an expert guide having just completed work on a guidebook for the Battle Monuments Commission. The Grubers and Eisenhowers returned to Paris on September 13.

References

External links
 Papers of William R. Gruber, Dwight D. Eisenhower Presidential Library
 William Rudolph Gruber papers, The Hoover Institution Archives.
Generals of World War II

1890 births
1979 deaths
Military personnel from Cincinnati
United States Army personnel of World War I
Dwight D. Eisenhower
United States Army generals
Recipients of the Silver Star
United States Army generals of World War II